Debuccalization or deoralization is a sound change or alternation in which an oral consonant loses its original place of articulation and moves it to the glottis (usually , , or ). The word comes from Latin , meaning "cheek" or "mouth".

Debuccalization is usually seen as a subtype of lenition, which is often defined as a sound change involving the weakening of a consonant by progressive shifts in pronunciation. As with other forms of lenition, debuccalization may be synchronic or diachronic (i.e. it may involve alternations within a language depending on context or sound changes across time).

Debuccalization processes occur in many different types of environments such as the following:
 word-initially, as in Kannada
 word-finally, as in Burmese
 intervocalically, as in a number of English varieties (e.g. litter ), or in Tuscan (the house /la kasa/ → [la ˈhaːsa])

Glottal stop

Arabic
The Maltese language, which was originally an Arabic dialect, also shows this feature.

British and American English
Most English-speakers in England and many speakers of American English debuccalize  to a glottal stop  in two environments: in word-final position before another consonant (American English IPA)
get ready 
not much 
not good 
it says 
The  may then also be nasally released. (American English IPA)
Milton 
Martin 
mountain 
cotton 
Latin

Cockney English
In Cockney English,  is often realized as a glottal stop  between vowels, liquids, and nasals (notably in the word bottle), a process called t-glottalization.

German
The German ending -en is commonly realized as an assimilated syllabic nasal. Preceding voiceless stops are then glottally released, e.g.   ('laths'),   ('nape of the neck'). When such a stop is additionally preceded by a homorganic sonorant, it tends to be debuccalized entirely, creating the clusters . For example,   ('rag'),   ('banks').

Voiced stops are not usually debuccalized. However, many Upper German and East Central German dialects merge voiced and unvoiced stops at least word-internally, and the merged consonants may be debuccalized. Speakers are often unaware of this.

Glottal fricative

Slavey
All coda consonants in Slavey must be glottal. When a non-glottal consonant would otherwise be positioned in a syllable coda, it debuccalizes to :
 →  ('hat')
 →  ('scar')
 →  ('rope')

Scots and Scottish English

Proto-Greek
In Proto-Greek,  shifted to  initially and between sonorants (vowels, liquids, and nasals).
 Proto-Indo-European  → Proto-Greek  → Ancient Greek  "seven" (vs. Latin )

Intervocalic  had been lost by the time of Ancient Greek, and vowels in hiatus were contracted in the Attic dialect.
 post-PIE *ǵénesos → Proto-Greek  → Ionic  : Attic  "of a race"

 PIE  → Proto-Greek  → Attic-Ionic  : Aeolic  "I am"

Sanskrit
In Sanskrit,  becomes  (written  in transliteration) before a pause: e.g.  ('erotic love') becomes .

Additionally, the Indo-European aspirated voiced palato-velar *ǵʰ- became : e.g.  "arm" becomes Sanskrit .

West Iberian

Spanish

Galician

Portuguese
Portuguese is much less affected by debuccalization, but it is especially notable in its Brazilian variety.

Throughout Brazil, the phoneme  (historically an alveolar trill  that moved to an uvular position) has a rather long inventory of allophones: . Only  is uncommon.

The later Portuguese influence from other regions made those allophones become rarer in some areas, but the  merger remained in a few isolated villages and towns.

Finally, many  registers, especially those of the poor and of the youth, most northern and northeastern dialects, and, to a much minor degree, all other Brazilian dialects, debuccalize  (that is) but less so than in Spanish. However, a  merger or even a  merger occurs:  "but even so" or  "though, right, the same (f) one" ;  light "lighter, more slim", or also "less caloric/fatty" ;  "but from me, no" or  "not more from me" . A coda rhotic in the Brazilian dialects in the Centro-Sul area is hardly ever glottal, and the debuccalized  is unlikely to be confused with it.

Romanian
The same occurred in Old Spanish, Old Gascon, and Old Japanese and still occurs in Sylheti.

Goidelic languages

Loanwords
Debuccalization can be a feature of loanword phonology. For example, debuccalization can be seen in Indonesian loanwords into Selayar.

References

Bibliography

External links
 "Debuccalization" (Chapter 4 of Paul D. Fallon's The Synchronic and Diachronic Phonology of Ejectives [Routledge, 2001]) gives many other terms that have been proposed for the phenomenon.
 Debuccalization and supplementary gestures

Phonology